Gallogly is a surname. Notable people with the surname include:

Charlie Gallogly (1919–1993), British football player
Edward P. Gallogly (1919–1996), American politician
James L. Gallogly (born 1952), American university administrator and businessman
Mark Gallogly (born 1957), American businessman